S. gouldii may refer to:
 Scotophilus gouldii, a bat species in the genus Scotophilus
 Selenidera gouldii, the Gould's toucanet, a bird species

See also
 Gouldii (disambiguation)